Trevor Francis Greenshields (born 27 October 1941) is a former English cricketer.  Greenshields was a left-handed batsman.  He was born in Newcastle-upon-Tyne, Northumberland.

Greenshields made his debut for Durham against Staffordshire in the 1969 Minor Counties Championship.  He played Minor counties cricket for Durham from 1969 to 1978, making 34 Minor Counties Championship appearances.  He made his List A debut against Hertfordshire in the Gillette Cup.  He 3 further List A appearances, the last of which came against Yorkshire in the 1978 Gillette Cup.  In his 4 List A matches, he scored 42 runs at an average of 10.50, with a high score of 20.

References

External links
Frank Greenshields at ESPNcricinfo
Frank Greenshields at CricketArchive

1941 births
Living people
Cricketers from Newcastle upon Tyne
English cricketers
Durham cricketers